The Kerala Film Critics Association Award for Best Story is one of the annual awards given at the Kerala Film Critics Association Awards, honouring the best in Malayalam cinema.

Winners

See also
 Kerala Film Critics Association Award for Best Screenplay

References

Story
Screenwriting awards for film